Kalagh Neshin (also Romanized as Kalāgh Neshīn) is a village in Saruq Rural District, Saruq District, Farahan County, Markazi Province, Iran. At the 2006 census, its population was 304, in 70 families.

References 

Populated places in Farahan County